Podradwanie  is a settlement in the administrative district of Gmina Szczucin, within Dąbrowa County, Lesser Poland Voivodeship, in southern Poland.

References

Podradwanie